Roman Szewczyk (born March 18, 1965 in Bytom) is a former Polish football player. He played 37 times for Poland, scoring 3 goals.

References

Sources

 

1965 births
Living people
Polish footballers
Poland international footballers
Śląsk Wrocław players
GKS Katowice players
FC Red Bull Salzburg players
FC Sochaux-Montbéliard players
Expatriate footballers in France
Expatriate footballers in Austria
Ekstraklasa players
Ligue 1 players
Ligue 2 players
Austrian Football Bundesliga players
Polish expatriate footballers
Sportspeople from Bytom
Szombierki Bytom players
Association football defenders